The Scott Sutherland School of Architecture and Built Environment, Robert Gordon University, is located at the university's Garthdee campus in Aberdeen, Scotland.

History

The Scott Sutherland School of Architecture and Built Environment, a long-established part of the Robert Gordon University, has provided  professionally accredited surveying courses since 1918. It was formed by the merging of the School of Construction, Property and Surveying and the Scott Sutherland School of Architecture. The School takes its name from Tom Scott Sutherland, an Aberdeen Architect and Entrepreneur, who gifted the School's Victorian Mansion house and grounds overlooking the River Dee in 1956, as well as making a generous bequest which is used to help finance study tours and visiting lecturers. More detailed information is available at the main Robert Gordon University article.

The Scott Sutherland School of Architecture and the Built Environment celebrated its 50th anniversary on the Garthdee site.

Campus
The RGU campus is located in a parkland setting on the north bank of the River Dee, in the south-west suburbs of Aberdeen, with a number of campus buildings designed by prominent architectural firms such as BDP (Sir Ian Wood building, formerly known as Riverside East) and Norman Foster's Foster + Partners (Business School building). The School is based in the Scott Sutherland Building, which is a modern building constructed in phases between the 1950s and early 1970s. The School also uses part of the 19th century Garthdee House (as originally donated by Tom Scott Sutherland), which is physically connected to the Scott Sutherland Building. However, new accommodation for the School is due to open in September 2015 as an extension to the university's Sir Ian Wood building.

The School has a close relationship with the adjacent Gray’s School of Art where students are encouraged to use the extensive workshop facilities. The Scott Sutherland School has a student-led lecture series which has run since 1988 and is called 5710, after the latitude of Aberdeen.

New Buildings

BDP is to design the campus for the Robert Gordon University and six of its buildings, including a new building to house the School of Architecture. The university’s director of estates Mike Berry said that while it was unusual for one architect to design all the buildings within a masterplan, this approach would help to avoid "the mad eclecticism" associated with new campuses designed by several architects. He said: "We’re a long way from unpacking this — it’s a 10 year vision. We want to create a sustainable campus in the fullest sense and we’ve appointed an organisation with the resources to do that." BDP landed the commission to design the £115 million Garthdee campus, west of the city centre, beating competition from Foster & Partners, RMJM, Edward Cullinan Architects, Capita Architecture, Pascall+Watson, Richard Murphy Architects and Sheppard Robson. The practice’s Glasgow office will oversee the university’s move to the campus — a project that involves working up an earlier masterplan by RMJM.

John McManus, a director at BDP Glasgow, said: "Designing a new building for the schools is a dream project. Many of my colleagues are graduates of the school that they will help to redesign." Associate Head of School, Dr Bassam Bjeirmi, also welcomed BDP’s appointment to design a new building for his department, adding: "We’ll use the design and building process as a teaching aid for our students. It’s going to be very useful from a research point of view."

Program
The current head of School is Professor David McClean. The School offers a Master of Architecture (MArch) programme as a first degree in architecture, and BSc Honours degrees in Surveying, Architectural Technology and Construction Design and Management. Postgraduate courses include the Graduate Diploma in Surveying and MSc courses in Advanced Architectural Studies, Construction Project Management, Property Development and Visualisation in Architecture and the Built Environment.
The School undertakes world leading research, including a PhD programme. Research at the School includes work concerning sustainable design, visualisation, collaborative and participatory design, pedagogy and project management. Staff from be school regularly contribute to leading academic journals and conferences, and much of the research activity is undertaken in association with public and private sector partners from across Europe. In the UK Research Excellence Framework 2014, over 60% of research in the School was judged to be at World Leading and International level.
As the most northerly school of architecture in the UK, the School works closely with the North East of Scotland community but maintains links with both the rest of the UK and Europe. The student lecture society, appropriately named 57 10 (after the latitude of Aberdeen), hosts many luminaries from the architecture profession.

Alumni
 Maxwell Hutchinson, architect and broadcaster
 Willie Miller, urban planner
 Knut Selberg, planner, architect, and urban designer

References

External links

 
 presidentsmedals.com
 bdonline.co.uk

Robert Gordon University
Architecture schools in Scotland
1918 establishments in Scotland
Educational institutions established in 1918